Lee Tae-hwa (born 15 November 1968) is a South Korean rower. He competed in the men's coxed four event at the 1988 Summer Olympics.

References

1968 births
Living people
South Korean male rowers
Olympic rowers of South Korea
Rowers at the 1988 Summer Olympics
Place of birth missing (living people)